Eutreta is a genus of the family Tephritidae, better known as fruit flies.

Systematics
Eutreta has three subgenera: Eutreta, Metatephritis and Setosigena.

These 36 species belong to the genus Eutreta:

Eutreta aczeli Lima, 1954
Eutreta angusta Banks, 1926
Eutreta apicalis (Coquillett, 1904)
Eutreta apicata Hering, 1935
Eutreta brasiliensis Stoltzfus, 1977
Eutreta caliptera (Say, 1830)
Eutreta christophe (Bates, 1933)
Eutreta coalita Blanc, 1979
Eutreta decora Stoltzfus, 1977
Eutreta diana (Osten Sacken, 1877)
Eutreta distincta (Schiner, 1868)
Eutreta divisa Stoltzfus, 1977
Eutreta eluta Stoltzfus, 1977
Eutreta fenestra Stoltzfus, 1977
Eutreta fenestrata (Foote, 1960)
Eutreta frontalis Curran, 1932
Eutreta frosti Hering, 1938
Eutreta hespera Banks, 1926
Eutreta intermedia Stoltzfus, 1977
Eutreta jamaicensis Stoltzfus, 1977
Eutreta latipennis (Macquart, 1843)
Eutreta longicornis Snow, 1894
Eutreta margaritata Hendel, 1914
Eutreta mexicana Stoltzfus, 1977
Eutreta novaeboracensis (Fitch, 1855)
Eutreta obliqua Stoltzfus, 1977
Eutreta oregona Curran, 1932
Eutreta parasparsa Blanchard, 1965
Eutreta patagiata Wulp, 1899
Eutreta pollinosa Curran, 1932
Eutreta rhinophora Hering, 1937
Eutreta rotundipennis (Loew, 1862)
Eutreta simplex Thomas, 1914
Eutreta sparsa (Wiedemann, 1830)
Eutreta xanthochaeta Aldrich, 1923

References

Tephritinae
Tephritidae genera
Diptera of North America
Diptera of South America